Bayview–Hunters Point (sometimes spelled Bay View or Bayview) is the San Francisco, California, neighborhood combining the Bayview and Hunters Point neighborhoods in the southeastern corner of the city. The decommissioned Hunters Point Naval Shipyard is located within its boundaries and Candlestick Park, which was demolished in 2015, was on the southern edge. Due to the South East location, the two neighborhoods are often merged. Bayview–Hunter's Point has been labeled as San Francisco's "Most Isolated Neighborhood".

Redevelopment projects for the neighborhood became the dominant issue of the 1990s, 2000s and 2010s. Efforts include the Bayview Redevelopment Plan for Area B, which includes approximately 1300 acres of existing residential, commercial and industrial lands. This plan identifies seven economic activity nodes within the area. The former Navy Shipyard waterfront property is also the target of redevelopment to include residential, commercial, and recreational areas.

Geography
The Bayview–Hunters Point districts are located in the southeastern part of San Francisco, strung along the main artery of Third Street from India Basin to Candlestick Point. The boundaries are Cesar Chavez Boulevard to the north, U.S. Highway 101 (Bayshore Freeway) to the west, Bayview Hill to the south, and the San Francisco Bay to the east. Neighborhoods within the district include Hunters Point, India Basin, Bayview, Silver Terrace, Bret Harte, Islais Creek Estuary and South Basin. The entire southern half of the neighborhood is the Candlestick Point State Recreation Area as well as the Candlestick Park Stadium which was demolished in 2015.

History

The Ohlone people 

Primarily composed of tidal wetlands with some small hills, the area was inhabited by the Yelamu and Ramaytush Ohlone people prior to the arrival of Spanish missionaries in the 1700s. The Ohlone inhabited the land for ten thousand years. The Muwekma Ohlone are neither the original people of San Francisco nor the original peoples of the San Francisco Peninsula. All of their Ohlone ancestral villages of origin were located exclusively in the East Bay in Chochenyo territory; therefore, their members are Chochenyo not Ramaytush. It has been incorrectly claimed that Ramaytush territory is Muwekma territory and refers to all Ohlone peoples from the San Francisco Bay area as Muwekma Ohlone. The phrase, "Muwekma Ohlone" refers to a tribe and should not be used to refer to all of the Ohlones peoples of the San Francisco Bay Area, past or present. Such usage offends other Bay Area Ohlone peoples who are not members of the Muwekma Ohlone Tribe. The original peoples of the San Francisco Peninsula were and are referred to as Ramaytush, which is the Chochenyo word meaning "people of the west.". The Ramaytush spoke a dialect of San Francisco Bay Costanoan language, which was one of three dialects, including Chochenyo and Tamyen. There were six Costanoan languages in total: Karkin, San Francisco Bay, Awaswas, Mutsun, Rumsen, and Chalon. The district consisted of what the Ohlone people called "shell mounds", which were sacred burial grounds. The Spanish called them, Costanoans, or "coast dwellers". The land was later colonized in 1775 by Juan Bautista Aguirre, a ship pilot for Captain Juan Manuel de Ayala who named it La Punta Concha (English: Conch Point). Later explorers renamed it Beacon Point. For the next several decades it was used as pasture for cattle run by the Franciscan friars at Mission Dolores.

In 1839, the area was part of the  Rancho Rincon de las Salinas y Potrero Viejo Mexican land grant given to José Cornelio Bernal (1796–1842). Following the California Gold Rush, Bernal sold what later became the Bayview–Hunters Point area for real estate development in 1849. Little actual development occurred but Bernal's agents were three brothers, John, Phillip and Robert Hunter, who built their homes and dairy farm on the land (then near the present-day corner of Griffith Street and Oakdale Avenue) and who gave rise to the name Hunters Point. In 1850, Hunter began trying to sell lots in an entirely new city called “South San Francisco” on the peninsula that now bears his name. Physically isolated from the rest of the city by both Mission Bay and the Islais Creek estuary, the only way to get to Hunters Point aside from sailing was via the San Bruno Road, completed in 1858.

The Bayview–Hunters Point district was labelled "Southern San Francisco" on some maps, not to be confused with the city of South San Francisco further to the south.

 Islais Creek and "Sacred Sites"

The Muwekma Ohlone held and still hold Islais Creek by 3rd Street and Marin in the Bayview as one of fifty, "sacred sites". Islais Creek and the adjoining bay has been heavily polluted.  Of the original approximately 1500 people who inhabited the San Francisco Peninsula prior to the Portola Expedition in 1769, only one lineage is known to have survived. Their descendants form the four branches of the Ramaytush Ohlone peoples today.

Industrial development
Within ten years, 18 slaughterhouses were located in the area along with their associated production facilities for tanning, fertilizer, wool and tallow. The "reservation" (then bounded by present-day Ingalls Street, Third Street, from Islais Creek to Bayshore) and the surrounding houses and businesses became known as Butchertown. By 1888, the city cracked down on the slaughterhouse district due to a diphtheria outbreak and a need for better sanitation. The city inspectors found under the slaughterhouses a foul smell, the decay of animal parts, and live pigs. The butcher industry declined following the 1906 San Francisco earthquake until 1971 when the final slaughterhouse closed.

From 1929 until 2006 the Bayview–Hunters Point district were home for the coal and oil-fired power plants which provided electricity to San Francisco. Smokestack effluvium and byproducts dumped in the vicinity have been cited for health and environmental problems in the neighborhood. In 1994, the San Francisco Energy Company proposed building another power plant in the neighborhood, but community activists protested and pushed to have the current facility shut down. In 2008, Pacific Gas and Electric Company demolished the Hunters Point Power Plant and began a two-year remediation project to restore the land for residential development. The area remains a hub of business along 3rd Street, represented by the Merchants of Butchertown.

Shrimping industry

From 1870 to the 1930s, shrimping industries developed as Chinese immigrants begin to operate most of the shrimp companies. By the 1930s, there were a dozen shrimp operations in Bayview. In 1939 when the U.S. Navy took over the land under eminent domain for the Naval Shipyard. The Health Department came in and burned the shacks and docks that once provided a small village of fishermen and their families a steady living in the abundant shrimp harvest from the San Francisco Bay.

Shipyard

Shipbuilding became integral to Bayview–Hunters Point in 1867 with the construction there of the first permanent drydock on the Pacific coast. The Hunters Point Dry Docks were greatly expanded by Union Iron Works and Bethlehem Shipbuilding Corporation and were capable of housing the largest ships that could pass through the locks of the Panama Canal. World War I increased the contracts there for building Naval vessels and, in 1940, the United States Navy purchased a section of property to develop the San Francisco Naval Shipyard. Beginning in the 1920s, a strong presence of Maltese American immigrants, along with Italian Americans, began populating the Bayview, focused on the local Catholic St. Paul of the Shipwreck Church and the Maltese American Social Club. They were a presence until the 1960s when they began moving into the suburbs.

The shipbuilding industry saw a large influx of blue collar workers into the neighborhood, many of them African Americans taking part in the Great Migration. This migration into Bayview increased substantially after World War II due to racial segregation and eviction of African Americans from homes elsewhere in the city. Between 1940 and 1950, the population of Bayview saw a fourfold increase to 51,000 residents. The Hunter's Point shipyard at its peak employed 17,000 people and it was also where the first atomic bomb sailed for Tinian in 1945. However, another function of HPS was the loading of components of the atomic weapon “Little Boy” that was eventually used on Hiroshima. “Little Boy” was loaded on the USS Indianapolis on July 15, 1945, and is reported to have contained half of the uranium-235 (U-235) available in the United States, valued at the time at $300 million ($4.37 billion in 2018). The USS Indianapolis left Hunters Point at 6:30 am on July 16, 1945, but was not allowed to leave San Francisco’s harbor until 8:30 am, after the first atomic weapon test “Trinity” (5:29 am) had been confirmed successful in the New Mexico desert. In 1947, the Hunter's Point crane was constructed at the shipyard to repair battleships. It was the largest crane in the world at the time. The crane still looms large over the neighborhood today.

Until 1969, the Hunters Point shipyard was the site of the Naval Radiological Defense Laboratory (NRDL). The NRDL decontaminated ships exposed to atomic weapons testing and also researched the effects of radiation on materials and living organisms. This caused widespread radiological contamination and, in 1989, the base was declared a Superfund site requiring long-term clean-up. The Navy closed the shipyard and Naval base in 1994. The Base Realignment and Closure program manages various pollution remediation projects.

Environmental impact report

On January 10, 2010, Ohlone representatives, Ann Marie Sayers, Corrina Gould, Charlene Sul, and Carmen Sandoval, Ohlone Profiles Project, American Indian Movement West and International Indian Treaty Council penned a letter to then mayor of San Francisco, Gavin Newsom, about preserving the Ohlone historical sites at the Candlestick Point–Hunters Point shipyard stating “This is an important opportunity to work together to protect these ancient historical sites, honor our ancestors and insure that development pressures do not further damage critical Ohlone Indigenous sites, the sites affected by the development are extremely significant and are believed to be burial or ceremonial sites, in addition to protecting these sites, we also want to work with the local community to protect their health, the land and the fragile Bay marine environment.”

On June 12, 2014, Vice published an article on the history, environmental bigotry and radiation effects on the residents of the neighborhood.

Italian, Portuguese, and Maltese community development 

Upon late 1800s settlement, there were many Italian, Maltese, and Portuguese home-builders, ranchers and truck farmers in the Bayview from 1890 to 1910. The growing population of Italian, Maltese, and Portuguese residents seemingly pushed out the early Chinese community that was located in the Bayview.

African-American community development

Redlining reports 
In the 1930s, the distribution of race and income in the neighborhood was fairly even. Two redlining reports from this time characterize the residential makeup of the area as lower-income: that is, residents were either "white collar" workers or factory laborers who had jobs in the vicinity. While "many of the inhabitants [were] from foreign extraction, no racial problem [was] presented." Poverty in the neighborhood was widely attributed to the depression. In 1937, the Home Owner's Loan Corporation made a redlining map to determine which San Francisco neighborhoods should receive loans for mortgages and general housing investment. Two districts in the Bayview Hunters Point received the two lowest possible grades. This lack of investment made it much harder for the area to rebound from the depression, and also made it very difficult for people trying to purchase new homes in the area. In 1942, to address the housing shortage issue, the federal government built 5,500 'temporary' housing units in the area for the families of shipyard workers. As a result, Hunters Point began as one of the most integrated areas in the city. Toward the end of WWII, the San Francisco Housing Authority pushed for the hiring of an all-white police force to govern the neighborhood. Many of the officers were recruited from the segregated south. From this point onwards, racial discrimination – in terms of the environment, housing, employment, and policing – shaped the development of the Bayview Hunters Point and further contributed to its segregation from the rest of the city.

By the 1950s and 60s, the Bayview was a predominantly African-American neighborhood that housed a movie theater along the Third Street corridor, as well as a library, a gymnasium at the time, Cub scouts through "Rec and Park" as well as youth baseball teams such as "The Blue Diamonds" of Innes [Street].

Racial tensions

By the 1960s, the Bayview and Hunters Point neighborhoods were populated predominantly by African-Americans and other racial minorities, and the area was isolated from the rest of San Francisco. Pollution, substandard housing, declining infrastructure, limited employment and racial discrimination were notable problems. James Baldwin documented the marginalization of the community in a 1963 documentary, "Take This Hammer", stating, "this is the San Francisco America pretends does not exist." On September 27, 1966, a race riot occurred at Hunters Point, sparked by the killing of a 16-year-old fleeing from a police officer. The policeman, Alvin Johnson, stated he "caught [a couple of kids] red-handed with a stolen car" and ordered Matthew Johnson to stop, firing several warning shots before fatally shooting Johnson. In 1967 US Senators Robert F. Kennedy, George Murphy and Joseph S. Clark visited the Western Addition and Bayview-Hunter's Point Neighborhood accompanied by future mayor Willie Brown to speak to activist Ruth Williams about the inequalities occurring in the Bayview. Closure of the naval shipyard, shipbuilding facilities and de-industrialization of the district in the 1970s and 1980s increased unemployment and local poverty levels.

Building projects to revitalize the district began in earnest in the 1990s and the 2000s. As in the rest of the city, housing prices rose 342% between 1996 and 2008. Many long-time African American residents, whether they could no longer afford to live there or sought to take advantage of their homes' soaring values, left what they perceived as an unsafe neighborhood and made an exodus to the Bay Area's outer suburbs. Once considered a historic African American district, the percentage of black people in the Bayview–Hunters Point population declined from 65 percent in 1990 to a minority in 2000. Despite the decline, the 2010 U.S. Census shows the African American population in the Bayview to be greater in number than that of any other ethnicity.

In the 2000s, the neighborhood became the focus of several redevelopment projects. The MUNI T-Third Street light-rail project was built through the neighborhood, replacing an aging bus line with several new stations, street lamps and landscaping. Lennar proposed a $2-billion project to build 10,500 homes, including rentals, and commercial spaces atop the former Hunters Point Naval Shipyard, and a new football stadium for the San Francisco 49ers, and a shopping complex for Candlestick Point. The stadium would reinvigorate the district, but the 49ers changed their focus to Santa Clara in 2006. Bids for the 2016 Summer Olympics in San Francisco that included plans to build an Olympic Village in Bayview–Hunters Point was also dropped. Lennar proposed to build the stadium without the football team. Local community activist groups have criticized much of the redevelopment for displacing rather than benefiting existing neighborhood residents.

Education

The Bayview, a historically predominant black neighborhood, is home to more elementary school-age students than any other neighborhood in the city and combined with the Mission and Excelsior, houses a quarter of all students in the district. Schools in the Bayview have suffered from declining enrollment for the past two decades. Out of the 6,000 students who live in the Bayview, more than 70% choose to attend school outside of their neighborhood. In 2016, in attendance with Jonathan Garcia, Adonal Foyle and Theo Ellington, Willie L. Brown middle school in Bayview-Hunter's Point commemorated the unveiling of the new Golden State Warrior outside basketball court at the school, donated by the Warriors Community Foundation. Bayview-Hunter's Point has several elementary and middle schools, one high school and has two college campuses. The schools include:

Elementary and early enrichment
 Whitney Young Development Center (now FACES SF)
 Erikson School (K)
 Frandelja Enrichment Center Fairfax
Frandelja Enrichment center Gilman
 Success Daycare
 Bret Harte elementary school
 George Washington Carver elementary school
 Hunters Point Number Two School
 Charles R. Drew Elementary School
 Leola M. Havard Early Education School
 Malcolm X Academy

Middle and junior high schools
 Joshua Marie Cameron Academy
 KIPP Bayview Academy
 KIPP San Francisco College Preparatory
 Willie L. Brown Jr. Middle School
 One Purpose School (K–12)
Thurgood Marshall High School
 Rise University Preparatory

High schools
 One Purpose School (K–12)
Thurgood Marshall High School
Joshua Marie Cameron Academy (7–12)
Coming Of Age Christian Academy (K–12)

Colleges
 City College of San Francisco—Evans Center
 City College of San Francisco—Oakdale Center

After school programs
 YMCA—Bayview 
 College Track
 Young Community Developers (YCD)
 Faces SF—Bayview

In 2004 Bill Cosby visited the Bayview-Hunter's Point school, Charles Drew Elementary where he railed against students and parents, criticizing them by saying "they must invest in their children's education before they wind up teenage moms, jail inmates, drug dealers -- or dead." In his speech—which was a topic of debate on conservative talk radio, on cable TV networks and in African American neighborhoods—Cosby lambasted low-income blacks for spending $500 on their children's shoes, but not spending $250 on the educational tool Hooked on Phonics. He furthered his statements by saying "I am talking about these people who cry when their son is standing there in an orange suit," he said in May. "Where were you when he was 2? Where were you when he was 12? Where were you when he was 18, and how come you didn't know that he had a pistol? And where is the father? ... You can't keep saying that God will find a way. God is tired of you." Then San Francisco schools chief Arlene Ackerman wrote a letter to Cosby shortly after the speech, inviting him to visit one of her three new "Dream Schools," low-performing public schools overhauled to include long school days, Saturday school, mandatory student uniforms, a more rigorous curriculum and required contracts signed by parents pledging to be involved in their children's education. He derided African Americans for wearing saggy pants, speaking improper English and giving children names like "Shaniqua, Shaligua, Mohammed and all that crap."

After his visit, Cosby praised the school, but he stressed that it was parents—not just the schools themselves—who needed to step up to ensure their children beat the statistics. "Parents are 99 percent," he said. "School districts don't parent. They teach."

In 2017, mentorship nonprofit, Friends of the Children received a four-year $1.2 million grant from the Social Innovation Fund, which will allow the national program to expand into San Francisco’s Bayview and Hunters Point neighborhoods. Friends of the Children provides long-term mentorship opportunities for children from kindergarten through high school. After 24 years of evaluation, the program was proven to increase high school graduation rates, decrease teen pregnancy, and reduce juvenile justice involvement.

Demographics
According to the 2010 U.S. Census, Bayview–Hunters Point (ZIP 94124) had a population of 33,996, an increase of 826 from 2000. The census data showed the single-race racial composition of Bayview–Hunters Point was 33.7% African-American, 30.7% Asian (22.1% Chinese, 3.1% Filipino, 2.9% Vietnamese, 0.4% Cambodian, 0.3% Indian, 0.2% Burmese, 0.2% Korean, 0.2% Japanese, 0.2% Pakistani, 0.1% Laotian), 12.1% White, 3.2% Native Hawaiian or Pacific Islander (2.4% Samoan, 0.1% Tongan, 0.1% Native Hawaiian), 0.7% Native American, 15.1% other, and 5.1% mixed race. Of Bayview's population, 24.9% was of Hispanic or Latino origin, of any race (11.5% Mexican, 4.2% Salvadoran, 2.6% Guatemalan, 1.4% Honduran, 1.4% Nicaraguan, 0.7% Puerto Rican, 0.2% Peruvian, 0.2% Spanish, 0.2% Spaniard, 0.1% Colombian, 0.1% Cuban, 0.1% Panamanian).

According to the 2010 U.S. Census, Bayview–Hunters Point had the highest percentage of African-Americans among San Francisco neighborhoods, home to 21.5% of the city's Black population, and they were the predominant ethnic group in the Bayview. Census figures showed the percentage of African-Americans in Bayview declined from 48% in 2000 to 33.7% in 2010, while the percentage of Asian and White ethnicity increased from 24% and 10%, respectively, to 30.7% and 12.1%. However the eastern part of the neighborhood had a population of 12,308 and is still roughly 53% African-American.

According to the 2005–2009 American Community Survey (ACS), the Bayview district is estimated to have 10,540 housing units and an estimated owner-occupancy rate of 51%. The 2010 U.S. Census indicates the number of households to be 9,717, of which 155 belong to same-sex couples. Median home values were estimated in 2009 to be $586,201, but that has since fallen dramatically to around $367,000 in 2011, the lowest of any of San Francisco's ZIP code areas. Median Household Income was estimated in 2009 at $43,155. Rent prices in the Bayview remain relatively low, by San Francisco standards, with over 50% of rents paid in 2009 at less than $750/mo.

A recent Brookings Institution report identified Hunters Point as one of five Bay Area "extreme poverty" neighborhoods, in which over 40% of the inhabitants live below the Federal poverty level of an income of $22,300 for a family of four. Nearly 12% of the population in the Bayview receives public assistance income, three times the national average, and more than double the state average. While the Bayview has a higher percentage of the population receiving either Social Security or retirement income than the state or national averages, the dollar amounts that these people receive is less than the averages in either the state or the nation.

Marginalization

Since the 1960s, the Bayview–Hunters Point community has been cited as a significant example of marginalization. In 2011, it remained "one of the most economically disadvantaged areas of San Francisco". Root causes include a working class populace historically segregated to the outskirts of the city, high levels of industrial pollution, the closure of industry, and loss of infrastructure. The results have been high rates of unemployment, poverty, disease and crime. Attempts to mitigate the effects of marginalization include the city's building of the Third Street light-rail line, establishment of the Southeast Community Facility (SECF) as a response from the SF Public Utilities Commission to a community-led effort to balance environmental injustice associated with public utilities, the Southeast Food Access Workgroup, initially formed by the SF Department of Public Health as part of the SF Mayor's ShapeUp SF health initiative, and implementation of enhanced local hiring policy that recognizes that regulations requiring hiring for public projects prioritize City residents and contractors may not help specific neighborhoods where job seekers and contractors may still be overlooked. Place-based and asset-based community building programs networked through the Quesada Gardens Initiative began in 2002 adding direct grassroots public participation to the social and environmental change landscape with a goal of preserving diversity and encouraging longterm residents to reinvest in their neighborhood.

The Hunter's Point shipyard's toxic waste pollution has been cited for elevated rates of asthma and other respiratory diseases among residents. These adverse health effects coupled with rising housing costs contribute to what one community member and organizer has characterized as behavior "meeting the UN standard definition of genocide".

Gang and drug activity, as well as a high murder rate, have plagued the Bayview–Hunters Point district. A 2001 feature article in the San Francisco Chronicle cited feuding between small local gangs as the major cause of the area's unsolved homicides. In 2011, The New York Times described Bayview as "one of the city's most violent" neighborhoods. Police have made the removal of guns from the streets their top priority in recent years, leading to a 20% decline in major crimes between 2010 and 2011, including declines of 35% in homicides, 22% in aggravated assaults, 38% in arson, 30% in burglary, 34% in theft, 23% in auto theft, and 39% in robbery. Lesser crimes have also declined by about 24% over the past year. As of 2018, crime rates in the area are 161% higher compared to the national average.  Auto theft averaged around 10 break-ins a day as of 2020.

Food Desert & Food Swamp
The USDA defines a food desert as a region without access to nutritious, affordable and quality whole foods. Food deserts are areas with a 20 percent or greater poverty rate and where a third of residents live more than a mile from a supermarket, farmers market or local grocery store. In the “grocery gap,” researchers from Food Trust found African Americans are 400 percent more likely to live in a community that lacks a full-service supermarket.

Until the late 2000s the neighborhood had no chain supermarkets. In 2011, a San Francisco official described the area as "a food desert – an area with limited access to affordable, nutritious food like fresh produce at a full-size grocery store." A large swath of the southeast sector of San Francisco sits within a Federally recognized food desert. A Home Depot was approved by the city to be built in the area, but the Home Depot Corporation abandoned its plans following the late 2000s economic crisis. Lowe's took over Home Depot's plans, and in 2010 opened their first store in San Francisco on the Bayshore Blvd. site. In August 2011, UK supermarket chain Tesco, owner of Fresh and Easy stores, opened Bayview–Hunters Point's first new grocery store in 20 years, though this store has closed as part of Fresh and Easy's larger corporate exit from the United States.

The neighborhood was the subject of a 2003 documentary, Straight Outta Hunters Point, directed by lifelong Hunters Point resident Kevin Epps, and a 2012 sequel, "Straight Outta Hunters Point 2," movies that expose the daily drama of gang-related wars plaguing a community already fighting for social and economic survival. The Spike Lee film Sucker Free City used Hunters Point as a backdrop for a story on gentrification and street gangs. On Third Street, the area’s main commercial strip, there was a Taco Bell/KFC combo, a McDonald’s (on Wallace Street) and a Walgreens (on Williams Street); a resident of the Bayview clarified: "The term ‘food swamp’ seems more accurate in that there’s food, but there’s a lack of easily obtainable healthy foods that people of different cultures like. Let’s put it this way: the neighborhood food landscape is improving all the time, but I still need to get on a bus or in a car to get a fresh carrot.” In 2002, the Quesada Gardens Initiative began with two people planting flowers and vegetables where space allotted; now there are 3,500 members who volunteer. At last count, Quesada Gardens Initiative produced 10,000 pounds of fruits and vegetables in a year. The transformation has also been slow but steady.

In 2011 Hunter's Point was labelled as the United States' top 9 worst food deserts in that same year the Bayview District welcomed Fresh & Easy, an upstart grocery chain owned by British food giant Tesco. The Bayview location delivered weak sales, but it was hardly alone: Tesco sold most of the stores and closed the rest in 2013, and the chain soon disappeared into bankruptcy. The store sat empty for a few years while former Supervisor Malia Cohen worked with former mayor Mayor Ed Lee and the Office of Economic and Workforce Development (OEWD) on finding a new owner. They landed on Howard and Amanda Ngo. With a $250,000 investment from OEWD and $4.1 million from the Small Business Administration, the couple hosted the grand opening for their second Duc Loi’s Pantry at 5800 Third Street in 2016. But the store closed in 2019 due to a range of factors, including lack of patronage from the surrounding community. Residents in the community voiced that both Fresh & Easy and Duc Loi’s Pantry could have done more to engage the locals. “In a growing community where there are folks who have been here for decades and new folks coming in, you have to find that connection with everyone that is around you and let them know that your service is available, and I just feel that both entities did not necessarily do that.”

In October 2021 it was made public that a first-of-its-kind “food empowerment market" would be placed in at Third and McKinnon where the former Doc Loi Pantry and Fresh & Easy grocery store had been. The idea is a community market that would distribute donated or subsidized food—but unlike a food bank, eligible shoppers would be able to pick and choose their own groceries and either pay for the goods at a subsidized price or obtain them for free. The market would also host an on-site community kitchen focusing on culinary education and offer free delivery service for seniors and those with mobility issues. The Food Empowerment Market idea stems from legislation introduced by District 11 Supervisor Ahsha Safai that allocates $1.5 million in startup funds from the Human Service Agency to establish the model for the new market in partnership with a yet-to-be-named neighborhood nonprofit. Bayview-Hunters Pointhas the highest rates of obesity in San Francisco with less than five percent of food sold in the neighborhood consisting of fresh produce. The neighborhood also has the most residents (mainly seniors) facing food insecurity than anywhere else in the city, according to a report from the San Francisco Department of Public Health.

District 10 supervisor Shamann Walton supports the idea, stating it would provide residents with unprecedented healthy choices, and that he’s hopeful The City will get behind any deal struck between the current owners of the vacant space and the Human Services Agency. This project would really focus on seniors and families as well, Latino and Black seniors are twice as likely to be food insecure in San Francisco, according to The City’s COVID-19 Command Center report. Many of them live in Bayview-Hunters Point and historically have low rates of enrollment in distribution and food delivery programs, making them hard to reach. Families experience the risks of living in a food desert early and intensely. Nearly 27% of pregnant Latina mothers and 20% of Black mothers in San Francisco don’t know where their next healthy meal is coming from. Children from those same families are also the most likely to consume fast food than their white peers. Any and all efforts to combat food insecurity should focus on seniors and families, two groups especially vulnerable to food insecurity, advocates and officials say. Doing so doesn’t just make for healthier communities, it starts down the path toward ensuring equity in opportunity and access for all residents.

Community activism
In April 1968, baseball icon, hall-of-fame inductee, and San Francisco Giants legend Willie Mays and Osceola Washington campaigned for "Blacks and Whites Together Fund Drive for Youth Activities this Summer. Bayview-Hunters Point Neighborhood Community Center."

A number of community groups, such as the India Basin Neighborhood Association, the Quesada Gardens Initiative, Literacy for Environmental Justice, the Bayview Merchants' Association, the Bayview Footprints Collaboration of Community-Building Groups, and Greenaction for Health and Environmental Justice work with community members, other organizations and citywide agencies to strengthen, improve, and fight for the protection of this diverse part of San Francisco.

Community gardening, art, and social history are popular in the area. The Quesada Gardens Initiative is a well recognized organization that has created a cluster of 35 community and backyard gardens in the heart of the neighborhood, including the original Quesada Garden on the 1700 block of Quesada Ave., the Founders' Garden, Bridgeview Teaching and Learning Garden (which won the 2011 Neighborhood Empowerment Network's "Best Green Community Project Award," Krispy Korners, the Latona Community Garden, and the new Palou Community Garden. Major public art pieces honor unique hyper-local history, grassroots involvement, and the right of communities to define themselves.

Redevelopment

Linda Brooks-Burton Library 

The original Anna E. Waden Bayview Branch Library was opened as a storefront facility in 1927. It was the 13th branch in the San Francisco Public Library system, replacing a "library station" that had been established in 1921. In 1969, a red brick building was built on the corner of 3rd Street and Revere Avenue in the Bayview-Hunters Point district. With a bequest from Anna E. Waden, a clerical employee of the City of San Francisco. Miss Waden's gift of $185,700 paid for the development of this cooperative community project. The building was completed in February 1969, and the formal dedication took place on July 12, 1969. The architect was John S. Bolles & Associates and the contractor was Nibbi Brothers. The façade included a sculpture by Jacques Overhoff. Linda Brooks Burton, born and raised in the Bayview was the Managing Librarian at the Bayview branch for 15 years before promotion to District Manager. She worked for the SF Public Library for 30 years total. Brooks-Burton was the driving force and central champion behind the new branch library building project. At the branch library, Linda co-founded the African American History Preservation Project in 2007 to create digital archives about a vanishing piece of local history as well as collected and recorded information about the migration of blacks to jobs at the Hunters Point Shipyard and the culture that developed in the area. And co-founded the Bayview Footprints Network of Community Building Groups in 2008. Bayview Footprints brought together dozens of community groups that tell the story of the Bayview online. Officials with the library system said Brooks-Burton was an advocate for education, youth and families. She served on the Bayview community boards of Whitney Young Child Development Center (now FACES SF) and Healing Arts Youth Center and all six branches in the South East. Brooks-Burton passed away Sept. 19, 2013, from a sudden heart attack and some residents had been calling for the branch to be named after her following her death. Library officials said Brooks-Burton was a “tireless community champion” and officials called her the quiet champion behind the effort to build a new branch library in the Bayview. The Anna E. Waden Library finished construction in 2013, it was renamed in honor of Linda Brooks-Burton in 2015 and is located at Third Street and Revere. The building cladding is also inspired by African textile designs. In the buildings outside atrium are west African Adinkra symbols.

Redevelopment of Hunters Point Naval Shipyard and environmental racism
In 2016, Tetra Tech, the firm in charge of overseeing the cleanup of toxic material on the naval base, was charged with negligence. In response, the Navy was forced to momentarily cease transferring shipyard land to Lennar for redevelopment. Hunters Point Naval Shipyard was a redevelopment project being spearheaded by Lennar on the 702 acres at Candlestick Point and the San Francisco Naval Shipyard. The plan called for 10,500 residential units, a new stadium to replace Candlestick Park,  of commercial and retail space, an 8,000- to  arena; artists' village and 336 acres of waterfront park and recreational area. The developers said the project would contribute up to 12,000 permanent jobs and 13,000 induced jobs.

The approval process required developers to address concerns of area residents and San Francisco government officials. Criticism of the project focused on the large-scale toxic clean-up of the industrial superfund site, environmental impact of waterfront construction, displacement of an impoverished neighborhood populace and a required build-up to solve transportation needs.

In July 2010, Lennar received initial approval of an Environmental Impact Report from San Francisco supervisors. In September 2011, the court denied the transfer of property to Lennar prior to clean-up of contamination. Per a letter sent from the EPA to the Navy, the process was placed on hold until “the actual potential public exposure to radioactive material at and near” the shipyard can be “clarified.”

"I am Bayview" campaign
Partnered with the office of Supervisor of District 10 Malia Cohen and Bayview Underground, I am Bayview helmed by creative George McCalman and photographer Jason Madara created a series of images of photographed community members to visually communicate gentrification. George states that if "one is going to move into a neighborhood, you should get to know the people who live there, not simply displace an existing community. Gentrification is a hot button issue in San Francisco. This was our visual response. Twenty-nine posters are now installed along the 3rd Street corridor of the Dogpatch and Bayview, capturing the Bayview residents who represent their neighborhood proudly."

I am Bayview has also been subject to criticism as some Bayview- and San Franciscan-born people felt it promoted the gentrification of the neighborhood.

Pan-African flags
In 2017, Supervisor Malia Cohen and the city of San Francisco "tagged" Third Street poles with red, black and green stripes in honor of Black History Month and to honor Black residents' heritage in Bayview–Hunters Point. Cohen issued a statement issued a statement explaining the reasoning behind the painting: “The intention of painting the flagpoles is to create a unifying cultural marker for the Bayview, in the same vein as the Italian flags painted on poles in North Beach, the designation of Calle 24 in the Mission and the bilingual street signs and gates upon entering Chinatown. This is about branding the Bayview neighborhood to honor and pay respect to the decades of contributions that African-Americans have made to the southeast neighborhood and to the city. It’s also beautification for the streetscape.” Many neighbors were pleased to see the tribute to African-Americans' community legacy. Several early risers in the community took photos of the poles being painted, expressing their gratitude to Cohen.

Arts and technology

The Bayview has also been a quiet hub for the arts since 1957 and technology going back as far as 1984. Acts such as Ike and Tina Turner performed at the former Club Long Island located on what is now Third & McKinnon.

METRAe BaHu 

Operating from 1987-1998, BaHu Gallery was a free-space, non-commercial art gallery and installation location in Bayview-Hunters Point (BaHu).  BaHu was the second location for the exhibition spaces sponsored by METRAe, originally located in SOMA. The first METRAe show in 1984 featured beat poet Jack Micheline in a below ground, basement workshop.  During the METRAe BaHu period, dozens of artists were provided display areas, receptions open to the public, etc.  An inaugural show with multi-media artist S. Scott Davis III was curated by artist Dewey Crumpler, whose own work can be seen on the exterior of the Joe Lee Gym in Bayview Town Center.  Over the 10 year period,  participating artists included: Rene Yung, Susan Hersey, Tony Calkins, William Pattengill, Topher Delany, Jessica Bodner, Jack Freeman, and many others.

Sculptures in Bayview 

In the Bayview, there are recorded eighteen sculptures across the neighborhood they are:

 Invocation by Pepe Ozan
 SRL by Survival Research Laboratory 
 Ship Shape-Shifting Time by Nobuho Nagasawa
 Copra Cane
 Islais Sculpture by Cliff Garten
 Heron's Head Park Sculpture by Macchiarini Creative Design
 Time to Dream by Amana Johnson
 Sundial by Jaques Overhoff
 Big Fish by William Wareham
 Headless
 Ndebele by Fran Martin
 Bone Wall
 The Butterfly Girl by Jason Webster
 Gigantry by Matthew Passmore
 Nautica Swing by Matthew Gellar
 Bayview Horn by Jerry Ross Barish
 Hale Konon (Ohlone Canoe) by Jessica Bodner

Murals in Bayview 

In the 1980s an artist named Brooke Fancher's mural titled “Tazuri Watu” was commissioned and completed in 1987, "Tazuri Watu" has covered the side of a building located at the intersection of 3rd and Palou for three decades. Over time, the historical work of art had faded, and vandals have defaced portions of it. Earl Shaddix, executive director of Economic Development on Third, called for its restoration. Shaddix applied for a $25,000 grant from the city through the District 10 Participatory Budgeting program, spearheaded by former Supervisor Malia Cohen's office. The program allows residents of a few districts in San Francisco to vote on funding one-time neighborhood improvement projects. After a successful campaign, the city awarded the money in 2018, and planning for the restoration began.

The city commissioned a Malcolm X mural on the Kirkwood Star Market, painted by artist Refa-1 in 1997 and the murals painted on Joseph Lee Recreational Center by artist Dewey Crumpler titled "The Fire Next Time" (presumably after the James Baldwin book of the same name) in 1984 of Harriet Tubman, Paul Robeson, two Senufo birds which in African culture oversee the lives and creativity of the community, King Tut, Muhammed Ali, Willie Mays, Wilma Rudolph and Arthur Ashe.

On Egbert Street, painted by Korean artist Chris "Royal Dog" Chanyang Shim in 2016, a mural features a young African-American girl in a traditional Korean hanbok robe with Korean characters above her head translate to the phrase “You will be a blessing.” Other artists that contributed to the 9 murals alone Egbert St are Cameron Moberg, Ricky Watts, Dan Pan, Strider, Annie, Vanessa Agana Espinoza, Mel Waters, William Holland crowned "The Mayor of Egbert" by the community.

The murals were revealed during Imprint City's "block party" and was mostly commissioned with private funds, but public funds were secured by the California Arts Council. On April 21, 2021 Afatasi the Artist, Tanya Herrera and 4 other artists designed a group of the new murals that line Evans Avenue and Hunters Point Boulevard viewed only in the pedestrian lane in Bayview-Hunters Point.

Along the Third Street corridor, there are many more murals including:

Multimedia and technology 

Kimberly Bryant founded Black Girls Code, not-for-profit organization that focuses on providing technology education for African-American girls, in the Bayview in 2011.

In 2012, Leila Janah started Samaschool with a pilot program in the Bayview-Hunters Point community. The model originally focused on training students to perform digital work competitively, to prepare them for success on online work sites like oDesk and Elance.

A collaboration was completed with singer-songwriter Michael Franti and Freq Nasty, in which Franti's single "The Future" was remixed in support of a Bay Area nonprofit Beats for a Better Future to help create a music studio for at-risk youth in Bayview-Hunters Point.

Although located in the Dogpatch district not Bayview, long time center for technology and the arts, BAYCAT Studio (short for Bayview Hunters Point Center for Arts and Technology provides a productive space for low-income youth, young people of color, and young women in the Bay Area to learn the technical side of multi-media production. According to their site, BAYCAT exists "to end racial, gender, and economic inequity by creating powerful, authentic media while diversifying the creative industry. Through the education and employment of low-income youth, young people of color, and young women in the Bay Area, and producing media for socially-minded clients, we are changing the stories that get shared with the world."

Imprint City, BayviewLIVE, and music performances 

Started by Tyra Fennell, Imprint City is a non-profit organization located in the Bayview that seeks to activate underutilized spaces with arts and culture events as well as community development projects, encouraging increased foot traffic and economic vitality. The BayviewLIVE Festival, celebrates urban performing and visual artists with past featured headliners such as Talib Kweli, Busta Rhymes, Kamaiyah, Nef the Pharaoh and Jidenna.

Dance 

The Hunters Point Shipyard is home to the country's largest artist colony, "The Point". Zaccho Dance Theatre, founded by Artistic Director Joanna Haigood, one of the main professional dance companies in BVHP since opening their studio in 1990. In 2018 the Zaccho Dance Studio put on a live event titled, Picture Bayview Hunters Point that showcase the history of Bayview-Hunter's Point through dance. Other studios include all female dance studio, Feline Finesse Dance Company.

Landmarks and attractions

Historic buildings 

Five buildings historic buildings in the district, which are listed in as San Francisco Designated Landmarks.

The Bayview Opera House (previously South San Francisco Opera House), located at 4705 Third St., was constructed in 1888 and designated a California landmark on December 8, 1968. It was nominated for the National Registry in 2010, and won the Governor's Award for Historic Preservation in 2011. For Black History Month in 2014, Tony Saunders hosted an event at the opera house with special guest. In 2017 the Bayview opera house hosted Hercules in the Bayview presented by Theater of War Productions and featured dramatic readings by acclaimed actors Reg E. Cathey, Frances McDormand, Linda Powell, David Strathairn who read scenes from Euripides' The Madness of Hercules. The event was partnered by Bret Harte School and OnePurpose School, the Golden State Warriors, Bayview Hunters Point YMCA, The San Francisco Foundation, KQED, The 3rd Street Youth Center & Clinic, Infinity Productions Inc., former D10 Supervisor Malia Cohen, and The San Francisco Chapter of The Links, Incorporated. The Opera House has also screened films such as The Hate U Give, Sorry to Bother You, Blindspotting, and Toni Morris: The Pieces I Am.

The Albion Brewery was built in 1870 and opened as the Albion Ale And Porter Brewing Company (this was also the location of the Hunters Point Springs and the Albion Castle). Located at 881 Innes Avenue, it was listed as a San Francisco Designated Landmark on April 5, 1974.

The Quinn House, located at 1562 McKinnon Avenue, was built in c. 1875 and listed as a San Francisco Designated Landmark on July 6, 1974.

The Sylvester House at 1556 Revere was built in c. 1870 and listed as a San Francisco Designated Landmark on April 5, 1974.

Recreation areas

Candlestick Park 

On July 26, 2013, prior to being demolished, Justin Timberlake and Jay-Z brought the Legends of the Summer Stadium Tour to Candlestick Park.

Many acts prior and after had also performed at Candlestick including The Beatles, Rolling Stones, Jimmy Buffett, Van Halen, Scorpions, Metallica and Paul McCartney. Pope John Paul II celebrated a Papal Mass on September 18, 1987 at Candlestick Park during his tour of America.

Martin Luther King Jr Memorial Swimming Pool 
In 1968, actor Steve McQueen and mayor Joseph Alioto attended the ceremonial groundbreaking for the Martin Luther King Jr. Memorial swimming pool at Third Street and Carroll Avenue. The makers of McQueen's film 'Bullitt', Warner Bros Studios, donated an initial $25,000 towards the pool's construction in hopes to raise another $50,000 at the movie premiere. Director Woody Allen is also credited with donating $5000 to this project.

Parks 
Bayview is home to multiple large parks. Bayview Park is located on Key Avenue offers sweeping views of the city. Bayview K.C. Jones Playground features a swimming pool and baseball diamond. The Candlestick Point State Recreation Area located on the bay south of Bayview Hill at Candlestick Point is a popular attraction for kayakers and windsurfers. Heron's Head Park, located in the northern part of the neighborhood, is home to a recently resurgent population of Ridgway's rails and the EPA Award-Winning Heron's Head Eco Center. India Basin Shoreline Park features a playground and multipurpose "hypecourt", and it offers waterfront access. 

The Quesada Garden, located on Quesada Avenue and 3rd Street in the heart of the neighborhood, is a landmark community open space on a public right-of-way. It is connected to a showcase community food producing garden (Bridgeview Community Teaching and Learning Garden) by two large murals produced with the community by artists Deidre DeFranceaux, Santie Huckaby, Malik Seneferu, and Heidi Hardin. Together, these projects have turned one of the most dangerous and blighted corridors in San Francisco into the safe route through the neighborhood, and have created a destination point for residents and visitors. Karl Paige and Annette Young Smith, retired residents, started planting on an urban median strip in 2002, and were quickly joined by neighbors to complete what is now a 650-foot by 20-foot focal point for flowers, food, art and community building. Thirteen mature Canary Island date palm trees on the block are on the San Francisco Registry of Historic Trees. In 2008 Annette Smith, one of the founders of the revitalized Quesada Community Garden.

India Basin Waterfront Park 
In 2014, the San Francisco Recreation and Park Department acquired the 900 Innes Avenue property in India Basin. The property was the former site of a shipbuilding center, and an 18-month environmental cleanup at the site was completed in August 2022. In October 2018, the San Francisco Board of Supervisors approved a plan to combine India Basin Shoreline Park, India Basin Shoreline Open Space, and the 900 Innes Avenue lot to create India Basin Waterfront Park. In February 2022, the city of San Francisco unveiled an Equitable Development Plan (EDP) "with the goal of preserving the culture and identity of the historic neighborhood" during the construction of the park. The partnership includes the A. Philip Randolph Institute, the Trust for Public Land, and San Francisco Parks Alliance. India Basin Waterfront Park is part of the Blue Greenway initiative to connect San Francisco's southeast waterfront with a series of parks, open spaces, and trails spanning from Oracle Park to Candlestick Point.

Ghost streets 

The Bayview and Hunter's Point has many "ghost streets", streets with long corridors that have been since the 1940s. "Ghost streets" exist at the streets Westbrook and Hunters View at the Westbook Public Housing at Fitch Street above Innes Avenue, "Hudson Street" (the fence) above Hawes and Innes. The slope here is a hotspot of native habitat, so aficionados of plants and insects. The locals treat Hudson Street as a way of relieving the heavy traffic on Hunters Point Blvd and Innes Avenue. Another is Earl Street which runs along the fence separating the India Basin Open Space and some private properties from the former Naval Base.

"All My USO'S"

Yearly at Gilman Park in Bayview, the Polynesian and Samoan community host a BBQ called "All My Uso's" (AMU). The BBQ is held to honor both the heritage of the communities as well as the humanity amongst people. Every year one of the founders JT Mauia who passed of cancer and community activist Taeotui "Jungle Joe" who tragically passed from gun violence are honored. At the barbecue kids get free haircuts and face-paint jobs are also offered. All My Uso's (AMU) was founded in San Francisco, CA in 2015 and established as a non-profit organization in 2017. AMU’s mission is to promote cultural identity while celebrating diversity and empowerment in underrepresented communities.

Businesses on the Third Street Corridor 

Also along the Third Street corridor there were two Walgreens. One was located in the Bayview Plaza (which closed in 2019) and another on Williams and Third Street (previously a meat packing company which burned to the ground). There is also a McDonald's located on Wallace Street and a Starbucks coffee in the Bayview Plaza.

Speakeasy Brewery offers tours and beer, and hosts live music at their "Final Friday" events. Restaurants such as Chef Eskender Aseged's Radio Africa & Kitchen, Old Skool Cafe, The Jazz Room, Limón Rotisserie, and Brown Sugar Kitchen, join an existing group of established restaurants up and down the Third Street corridor, including Frisco Fried, El Azteca burrito shop, Las Isletas, Yvonne's Southern Sweets, and "Butcher Town" which includes Gratta Wines and Fox and Lion Bakery. The San Francisco Wholesale Produce Market, located on Jerrold Avenue, has been at the center of food distribution in San Francisco since long before moving to its Bayview location in 1963.

After 60 years, the historic and iconic Sam Jordan's Bar and Grill at 4004 3rd Street closed in 2019. Sam Jordan's Bar and Grill was the oldest African-American bar in San Francisco. The Galvez block was renamed "Sam Jordan's Way" in his honor.

In June 2020, San Francisco native, Reese Benton, opened the city's first black-owned woman-led cannabis dispensary, Posh Green Retail Store.

A Lucky's grocery store opened at Bayview Plaza (the site where the old Walgreens stood) in 2022.

Mother Brown's Dining Room 
Mother Brown's Dining Room United Council of Human Services has been a long staple in the Bayview and provides two meals a day to area homeless in the Bayview District but due to permit issues, beds cannot be provided so plastic chairs are provided instead.

5700 and 5800 Third Street 
Between 2012–2019, the 5700 and 5800 Third Street area in the Bayview was the host of many businesses including Wing Stop, Limón Rotisserie, Fresh and Easy grocery store (closed in fall 2013), locally owned grocery store Duc Loi (closed in 2019), as well as restaurants such as CDXX, and Corner Café. None of which have been able to remain open due to the location along the Third Street corridor.

Post offices

The Bayview currently has two major USPS offices, the second-largest branch (next to Napoleon Street) located on Evans Street, and a smaller branch on Williams Street.

The USPS in 2011 told Bayview postal employees, community leaders, and local politicians that the closure of Bayview's Williams location was "not in the plans" and "off the table". Months later, all Bayview postal customers were mailed official notifications of an impending closure. This stirred up controversy in the immediate community, sparking frustrations and outrage. From residents to politicians, many cited racial and social bias as the reasoning for the closure of the location. Residents were encouraged to use their voices and call local the local postmaster.

In 2012 postmaster Raj Sanghera announced that the Bayview Williams location was taken off the closure list, with other branches as well located in Visitacion Valley, Civic Center, McLaren Station, and San Bruno Avenue.

During the COVID pandemic in 2020, after calling for a #DontMessWithUSPS Day of Action and nearing the November 2020 elections, House Speaker Nancy Pelosi showed up at the Bayview Post Office in San Francisco on Williams Street to discuss her new bill funding the USPS and blocking the Trump administration's overhaul of it. She also had won concessions on mail delivery. Pelosi accompanied with District 10 supervisor, Shamann Walton exclaimed that the Trump administration had been trying to "tamper" with the mail-in ballots by closing several post offices across the country. Other speakers at the Bayview event included letter carriers, someone whose mailbox had been removed, and a veteran with epilepsy who depends on the postal service for medication.

Transportation
The Bayview is served by the Muni bus and light rail system. Caltrain commuter rail service runs the eastern part of the neighborhood. The rail line formerly served the Paul Avenue station in the Bayview until it closed in 2005. The transportation system enables trips that are minutes to/from downtown being 1/2 mile from Hwy 101 and Interstate 280, and 1.5 miles from Dogpatch and UCSF-Mission Bay. The neighborhood is also 15 min way from SFO. Opening in 2007, the T-Third Street line, a line extension of the Muni Metro system, linked Bayview-Hunters Point to downtown San Francisco. In addition to facilitating a connection between the neighborhood and the rest of the city, many residents cite the T-Third Street also being a contributing factor to rising property values and housing prices in the area.

Muni transit lines that run through the Bayview include:

Active lines
 T Third Street
 23 Monterey
 54 Felton
 24 Divisadero
 T Owl
 9 San Bruno
 9R San Bruno Rapid
 10 Townsend
 15 Bayview-Hunters Point Express
 19 Polk
 29 Sunset
 33 Ashbury/18th Street
 44 O'Shaughnessy
 48 Quintara/24th Street
 54 Felton
 56 Rutland
 67 Bernal Heights
 90 San Bruno Owl
 91 3rd Street/19th Avenue Owl.

Defunct lines
 15 Kearny (Now the T Third Street)
 16 Third Street (Now the T Third Street)

San Francisco 49ers pre and post game-day shuttles
 75X Candlestick Express	Balboa Park Station
 77X Candlestick Express	California and Van Ness
 78X Candlestick Express	Funston and California	
 79X Candlestick Express	Sutter and Sansome	
 86 Candlestick Shuttle	Bacon and San Bruno	
 87 Candlestick Shuttle	Gilman and Third Street

In popular culture

Video Games
 In the 2016 Ubisoft game Watch Dogs 2 which was set in a fictional version of San Francisco, the art installation Bayview Rise was featured.

Print
 The San Francisco Bay View is an African-American newspaper with headquarters located on Third Street.
 Thrasher magazine also houses headquarters in the Bayview.
 The Examiner prints out of the Bayview.
 The Sun-Reporter, a historic weekly newspaper, operates out of Bayview.

Radio
 Radio station KYA broadcast out of Bayview Park until it was sold to the Hearst Publishing Company in 1934, becoming the full-time voice of the San Francisco Examiner.
 KALW 91.7 FM local public radio and the San Francisco Arts Commission to tell the stories of the people who live, work, and have a positive impact on San Francisco's Bayview neighborhood

Film

Full-length films
 The Midnight Story starring Tony Curtis, some scenes in the film were shot in Bayview. The St. Joseph Orphanage Asylum, originally located at Revere/Newhall, is the site of several set-ups.  The All Hallows Chapel, at Newhall/Palou is also used in the funeral scene. (1957)
 The Hunters Point Shipyard made a cameo appearance in Alfred Hitchcock's Vertigo. (1958)
 The Bayview's Candlestick Park was also home to the location for the climactic scene in the thriller Experiment in Terror. (1962)
 Take This Hammer, a film aired by KQED directed by Richard O. Moore, follows author and activist James Baldwin in the spring of 1963 as he's driven around San Francisco to meet with members of the local African-American community. (1963)
 The film Bullitt features scenes filmed in the Bayview. (1968)
 Freebie and the Bean, a Richard Rush comedy was also filmed at Candlestick Park in Bayview. (1974)
 The Fan, the Robert DeNiro and Wesley Snipes film was also filmed in the Bayview. (1996)
 The Spike Lee film, Sucker Free City, Hunter's-Point was used as a backdrop. (2004)
 The Will Smith film The Pursuit of Happyness, the film had a scene that took place at Candlestick Park. (2006)
 Scenes for the film Contagion, starring Matt Damon, Kate Winslet and Jude Law, were filmed at Candlestick stadium. (2011)
 The Last Black Man in San Francisco features scenes that were filmed in Hunter's Point. The Allen house (901 Innes Ave.) and the dock undergoing a hazardous materials cleanup (881 Innes Ave.) in the film's opening scenes are located on adjacent blocks on Innes Street. (2019)

Short films
 Palm Trees Down 3rd Street, is a short film and film festival winner, directed by Maria Judice, that features the 3rd street corridor.

Music videos

Music videos with prominent artists that feature the Bayview or Hunter's Point 
 RBL Posse's hit "Don't Give Me No Bammer Weed" was filmed in the Hunter's Point community and features cameos from Ainsley and NBA legend, Shaquille O'Neal. (1992)
 Larry June's music video "Smoothies 1991" (2019)
 Marcus Orelias's music video "Blackouts" featuring Stephan Marcellus (2017)
 Jordan Gomes also known as Stunnaman02's music video "Out that Window" (2019)

Documentaries
 The short film Point of Pride, released in 2014, is a documentary that focuses on the Bayview-Hunter's Point social uprising of the 50s and 60s.
 Straight Outta Hunters Point was a widely successful early 00s documentary made by filmmaker Kevin Epps showcasing the gang violence in Bayview-Hunter's Point.
 Bay View Hunter's Point: San Francisco's Last Black Neighborhood? an Andante Higgins produced documentary (2004)
 A Choice of Weapons (2008)

Television
 KQED aired news footage of Bobby Kennedy and George Murphy describing their impressions of housing in Bayview Hunters Point in 1967. The footage also included representatives of Bayview Hunters Point, including Osceola Washington, Harold Brooks and Suzanne Cook.
 Discovery Channel's, Forgotten Planet – Episode 3 focuses on the Hunter's Point Shipyard.
 Sam Jordan's Bar appeared on an episode of Spike's Bar Rescue.
 During the Versuz battle of the Bay between Bay Area legends, E-40 and Too Short. Too Short shouted out the Bayview community. (2021)
 In the cult-classic animated TV show Fillmore!, one of the main characters - Ingrid Third was named after the Third Street corridor. The creator of the show, Scott M. Gimple had developed a keen fascination with San Francisco hence the name being coined after the Fillmore district while couch surfing in his early years.

Notable residents

Music
The Product (a rap-duo composed of Budwyser and Darace), one of the first rap groups out of Hunters Point.
 11/5, defunct gangsta rap group from the Oakdale public housing projects in Hunters Point
 Eric Melvin, guitarist for NOFX
 RBL Posse, gangsta rap group from Harbor Road public housing projects in Hunters Point
 Ramirez, punk rapper, from Bayview-Hunter's Point signed to New Orleans based label G*59 Records.
Prezi, rapper from Hunter's Point. 
Cindy Herron, singer and founding member of En Vogue.
Martin Luther McCoy, actor, guitarist and musician.
Larry June, rapper from Hunter's Point.
Jordan "Stunnaman02" Gomes, rapper and actor from Bayview.
Marcus Orelias, rapper, actor, and entrepreneur from Bayview. 
Michael Franti, rapper, musician, poet, activist, documentarian, and singer-songwriter.
Boo Banga, rapper from the Hunter's Point community, famously featured on San Quinn's "San Francisco Anthem".
Herm, rapper from the Bayview-Hunter's Point.

Film, theatre, and television
 Kevin Epps, filmmaker best known for the documentary Straight Outta Hunters Point
 Terri J. Vaughn (born 1969), actress born and raised in Bayview–Hunters Point
 Iman Rodney, videographer and Emmy Award winner.
Maria Judice, filmmaker and artist.
André Fenley, multi-award winning senior sound mixing, sound editor engineer at Skywalker Sound.
Ruth Williams was a producer, activist, playwright, and actress. She fundraised in the Bayview with the assistance of Tina Turner, Sly and the Family Stone, the O'Jays, Larry Graham, H.B. Barnum, Danny Glover, Chaka Khan and more. The Bayview Opera House's theatre is named after her.

Sports and fitness
Frank "Lefty" O'Doul (1897–1969), an american professional baseball player born and raised in the Bayview.
 Jimmy Lester (1944-2006), former boxer known as the "Bayview Blaster"
 Dion Jordan (born 1990), a professional NFL player born and raised in the Bayview.
 Desmond Bishop, professional NFL player
 Stevie Johnson (born 1986), NFL wide receiver, born and raised in Hunters Point before moving to Fairfield, CA
 Eric Wright (born 1985), NFL player, cornerback for the San Francisco 49ers
Sam Jordan (1925-2003), professional boxer, politician and founder of Sam Jordan's Bar.
 Donald Strickland (born 1980), NFL player, free agent cornerback who played for the San Francisco 49ers, Indianapolis Colts and New York Jets
 Maria Kang (born 1980), fitness advocate, coach, blogger and founder of the "No Excuse Mom" movement.

Medical
 Dr. Arthur H. Coleman (1920–2002), the first black physician and one of the last privately practicing family doctors in San Francisco's Bayview-Hunters Point district.
 Dr. Ahimsa Sumchai (born 1952), nutritionist, environmental activist and former professional gymnast responsible for winning the San Francisco Citywide Gymnastics Competition in 1964.

Education
 Linda Brooks-Burton, was a librarian, educator, activist, and loved member of the Bayview community. The main Bayview library is named in her honor.

Politics and activism
 Espanola Jackson (1934–2016), heralded as "Bayview's greatest activist"; a member of the Muwekma Ohlone tribe.
 Elouise Westbrook (1915–2011) activist
 Mary L. Booker (1931–2017), civil rights activist
 Big Five of Bayview, environmental and community activist
 Sophie Maxwell, resident of the Bayview and former district 10 supervisor.
 Christopher Muhammad, Bay Area Minister of the Nation of Islam
 Marie Harrison (1948–2019), Bayview environmental activist.
Shamann Walton, resident of the Bayview and district 10 supervisor.

See also

References

External links

 Profile: Bayview–Hunters Point 2006 11-part series UC Berkeley School of Journalism
 Community-building through informal resident-led groups known as Quesada Gardens Initiative
 Community's user-generated calendar of events created by Footprints community network
 Bayview Merchants' Association
 Bay View Newspaper
 Bayview MAGIC – Community of color collaborative
 Historic Hunters Point in pictures
 India Basin Neighborhood Association
 Map of India Basin
 Islais Creek History Neighborhood Parks Council
 Hunters Point infant mortality rate is comparable to Bulgaria
 Hunters Point Shipyard redevelopment
 1966 Hunters Point riot
 Review of a documentary film about Hunters Point
 Alternative economic development for Bayview–Hunters Point
 Community Window on the Shipyard, an archive of Shipyard-related documents
 Literacy for Environmental Justice, a local organization working on Environmental Justice issues in Hunters Point
 Artists at Hunters Point Shipyard
 Department of the Navy BRAC Program Management Office

African-American culture
African-American history in San Francisco
History of San Francisco
Populated coastal places in California
Bayview–Hunters Point, San Francisco